Jorge Baltazar Cordero Aróstegui (born 6 January 1962) is a retired Peruvian international footballer.

Career
Born in Ica, Peru, Cordero played for several local sides as well as in Argentina for Gimnasia y Esgrima La Plata. Cordero made 14 appearances for the Peru national football team from 1987 to 1991. He participated in the 1991 Copa América.

References

External links

1962 births
Living people
People from Ica, Peru
Association football midfielders
Peruvian footballers
Peru international footballers
1987 Copa América players
1991 Copa América players
Peruvian Primera División players
Argentine Primera División players
Club Alianza Lima footballers
Unión Huaral footballers
Club de Gimnasia y Esgrima La Plata footballers
Deportivo Sipesa footballers
Sport Boys footballers
Peruvian expatriate footballers
Expatriate footballers in Argentina